Timok (Cyrillic: Тимок, Romanian: Timoc) is a river in eastern Serbia and western Bulgaria.

Timok may also refer to:
Timok Valley, a region in Serbia around the river
FK Timok Zaječar, Serbian football club
Tributaries of Timok river:
Beli Timok
Trgoviški Timok
Svrljiški Timok
Crni Timok